The Adelphikos (αδελφικός) fraternity, formed in 1913, is a Grove City College (Grove City, Pennsylvania), social fraternity.

History
The fraternity was formed as an outgrowth of the two campus debate clubs, the Webster and the Shakespeare, where an intense rivalry inspired eight of the Webster men to invite two of their rivals to join in formation of the fraternity, putting an end to the strife. Adelphikos' name is a coined, Greek-derived word, whose definition is known by its members.  From its beginning in 1913 when formed by 10 members of the student body, it has flourished on the campus uninterrupted for over ten successive decades. Adelphikos was the second official (recognized) fraternity on campus and the first group to use Greek letters directly in its name, vying in a friendly rivalry for "first" with another of the campus' 18 fraternities and sororities, the Pan Sophic.Neither group uses a common two- or three-letter Greek acronym.

Tragedy 
In 1974, seventeen Adelphikos pledges were walking back to campus from a fraternity event when a driver who had fallen asleep at the wheel plowed into them from behind. Four pledges - Thomas Morgan Elliott, John Curtin, Rudolph Mion, and Gary Gilliland - were killed. Today a memorial plaque to the four students sits on campus in front of Buhl Library. Although no alcohol was involved and the driver was deemed to be at fault, the incident triggered tightened control of fraternity practices and other student activities at the college. It remains one of the deadliest fraternity-related accidents in the United States.

Approximately 70 years after its founding, the fraternity experienced setbacks, struggling in the late 1970s in the aftermath of the pledge deaths, with members committing violations of campus rules which resulted in the loss of college recognition during the 1990s.

Re-establishment
Reemerging from this period in 2000, the fraternity was re-established as a Christian brotherhood. 

Adelphikos is not affiliated with any national fraternal organization. It is an independent organization, like all other Grove City fraternities.

Notable alumni 

 David M. Bailey, contemporary Christian musician
 Peter J. Boettke, economist at George Mason University, former president of the fraternity
 Matt Kibbe, President and Chief Community Officer of Free-The-People and Former CEO of FreedomWorks
 Ernest C. Young, notable agricultural economist who helped organize Purdue’s graduate school.
 Bob Glenn, an American baseball player and pioneer in the field of highway engineering.

See also
List of social fraternities and sororities

References

Local fraternities and sororities
Fraternities and sororities in the United States
Mercer County, Pennsylvania
Pennsylvania culture
Grove City College
Student organizations established in 1913
1913 establishments in Pennsylvania